The Fukuda Hikari Research-2 Motor Glider was a Japanese civil design which first flew in August 1941. Its gliding performance was encouraging but its development ended as Japan entered World War II in December 1941.

Design and development

In 1940 Fukuda received a request from the Aviation Board of Japan for a motor glider. The Fukuda Hikari Research-2 was completed in July 1941 and was only the  second Japanese motor glider, following the Nippon Hachi Motor Glider.

The Resesrch-2 had a wooden structure throughout and was fabric covered. It was a conventional low wing monoplane with a fixed undercarriage, distinguished by its higher than average (13.75) aspect ratio wing, which was tetrahedral in plan with slightly blunted tips. Like may gliders, the Research-2's wing was equipped with spoilers.

Behind the engine the fuselage was rounded in section. The Research-2 was flown from an enclosed cockpit over the wing leading edge; the top of the cockpit glazing merged, unbroken, into the upper fuselage. The tail was also conventional, though the fuselage-mounted horizontal surfaces were well forward of the vertical tail, which had a tall but narrow fin and large unbalanced rudder.

Its faired landing legs were kept short by wing root stubs with anhedral, producing a mild, inverted gull wing.

Operational history

The Research-2 was first flown on 5 August 1941. The pilot was Isamu Oda, an experienced flyer of both powered and unpowered aircraft. Subsequent tests showed better than calculated performance but later in the year Japan's involvement in the Second Sino-Japanese War broadened into the Pacific War, and civilian aircraft development ended.

Specifications

References

Single-engined tractor aircraft
Motor gliders
1940s Japanese civil aircraft
Low-wing aircraft
Aircraft first flown in 1941